Ray City is a city in Berrien County and Lanier County, Georgia, United States. The population was 1,090 at the 2010 census.

History
Early variant names were "Ray's Pond" and "Ray's Mill". The community was named after Ray M. Thomas, the proprietor of a local mill.

Geography
Ray City is in southern Berrien County, with a small portion extending south into Lanier County. U.S. Route 129 passes through the city, leading north  to Nashville, the Berrien county seat, and east  to Lakeland, the Lanier county seat. Georgia State Route 125 leads south from Ray City  to Valdosta, and State Route 37 leads west  to Adel.

Beaverdam Creek flows through the middle of the city, and Batterbee Branch flows through the west side. The two streams join west of Ray City to form Cat Creek, a south-flowing tributary of the Withlacoochee River, part of the Suwannee River watershed.

Demographics

2020 census

As of the 2020 United States census, there were 956 people, 484 households, and 313 families residing in the city.

2000 census
As of the census of 2000, there were 746 people, 296 households, and 203 families residing in the city. The racial makeup of the city was 76.41% White, 20.78% African American, 0.13% Native American, 0.54% Asian, 0.94% from other races, and 1.21% from two or more races. Hispanic or Latino of any race were 1.61% of the population.

There were 296 households, out of which 39.2% had children under the age of 18 living with them, 47.6% were married couples living together, 15.5% had a female householder, and 31.1% were non-families. 27.7% of all households were made up of individuals, and 11.5% had someone living alone who was 65 years of age or older.  The average household size was 2.52 and the average family size was 3.07.

In the city, the population was spread out, with 30.4% under the age of 18, 11.3% from 18 to 24, 31.2% from 25 to 44, 15.3% from 45 to 64, and 11.8% who were 65 years of age or older.  The median age was 30 years. For every 100 females, there were 91.8 males.  For every 100 females age 18 and over, there were 86.7 males.

The median income for a household in the city was $25,769, and the median income for a family was $32,614. Males had a median income of $26,354 versus $17,054 for females. The per capita income for the city was $12,788.  About 25.1% of families and 30.0% of the population were below the poverty line, including 32.7% of those under age 18 and 31.6% of those age 65 or over.

Gallery

References

Cities in Georgia (U.S. state)
Cities in Berrien County, Georgia
Cities in Lanier County, Georgia